José Antonio Arámbula López (born 9 December 1968) is a Mexican politician from the National Action Party. From 2009 to 2012 he served as Deputy of the LXI Legislature of the Mexican Congress representing Aguascalientes.

References

1968 births
Living people
Politicians from Aguascalientes
Members of the Chamber of Deputies (Mexico)
National Action Party (Mexico) politicians
21st-century Mexican politicians
Members of the Congress of Aguascalientes
Municipal presidents in Aguascalientes